El 13–13 is a 1943 Spanish comedy-drama film directed by Luis Lucia on his directing debut.

Cast
 Rafael Durán
 Ramón Martori
 Alberto Romea
 Marta Santaolalla

External links
 

1943 films
1943 comedy-drama films
1940s Spanish-language films
Films directed by Luis Lucia
Spanish comedy-drama films
Spanish black-and-white films
1940s Spanish films